Balsamnd, is a village in Hisar-II block of Hisar District of Hisar Division and Hisar (Lok Sabha constituency) in the Haryana state of India.

Facilities
Industrial training institute and Grain Mandi market were opened here in 2006. There is a Haryana Police post, State Bank of India,  ICICI Bank,

Education

Maharani Lakshmi Bai Post Graduate College, Bhiwani Rohilla is nearby in Bhiwnai Rohilla village. It offer B.A., B.Com., B.Sc., M.A. and M.Com degrees from its affiliate Kurukshetra University.

References

See also
 Bidhwan
 Kanwari
 Badyan Brahmnan
 Norangpura

Hisar district
Villages in Hisar district